Dorcadion maderi is a species of beetle in the family Cerambycidae. It was described by Breit in 1923. It is known from Albania.

See also 
Dorcadion

References

maderi
Beetles described in 1923